The 1993 Texas A&M Aggies baseball team represented Texas A&M University in the 1993 NCAA Division I baseball season. The Aggies played their home games at Olsen Field. The team was coached by Mark Johnson in his 9th year at Texas A&M.

The Aggies won the Central I Regional to advance to the College World Series, where they were defeated by the Long Beach State Dirtbags.

Roster

Schedule 

! style="" | Regular Season
|- valign="top" 

|- align="center" bgcolor="#ccffcc"
| 1 || February 9 ||  || Olsen Field • College Station, Texas || 5–4 || 1–0 || –
|- align="center" bgcolor="#ccffcc"
| 2 || February 9 || Dallas Baptist || Olsen Field • College Station, Texas || 7–6 || 2–0 || –
|- align="center" bgcolor="#ccffcc"
| 3 || February 12 ||  || Olsen Field • College Station, Texas || 3–2 || 3–0 || –
|- align="center" bgcolor="#ccffcc"
| 4 || February 13 || Washington || Olsen Field • College Station, Texas || 8–4 || 4–0 || –
|- align="center" bgcolor="#ccffcc"
| 5 || February 13 || Washington || Olsen Field • College Station, Texas || 7–4 || 5–0 || –
|- align="center" bgcolor="#ccffcc"
| 6 || February 14 || Washington || Olsen Field • College Station, Texas || 6–5 || 6–0 || –
|- align="center" bgcolor="#ccffcc"
| 7 || February 16 || at  || Unknown • San Marcos, Texas || 9–2 || 7–0 || –
|- align="center" bgcolor="#ccffcc"
| 8 || February 19 ||  || Olsen Field • College Station, Texas || 7–1 || 8–0 || –
|- align="center" bgcolor="#ccffcc"
| 9 || February 20 || Northeast Louisiana || Olsen Field • College Station, Texas || 9–1 || 9–0 || –
|- align="center" bgcolor="#ccffcc"
| 10 || February 23 || at  || Unknown • Huntsville, Texas || 7–0 || 10–0 || –
|- align="center" bgcolor="#ccffcc"
| 11 || February 24 ||  || Olsen Field • College Station, Texas || 17–3 || 11–0 || –
|- align="center" bgcolor="#ccffcc"
| 12 || February 26 ||  || Olsen Field • College Station, Texas || 4–1 || 12–0 || –
|- align="center" bgcolor="#ccffcc"
| 13 || February 27 || Texas–Pan American || Olsen Field • College Station, Texas || 3–1 || 13–0 || –
|- align="center" bgcolor="#ccffcc"
| 14 || February 27 || Texas–Pan American || Olsen Field • College Station, Texas || 4–2 || 14–0 || –
|-

|- align="center" bgcolor="#ffcccc"
| 15 || March 2 || Southwest Texas State || Olsen Field • College Station, Texas || 0–1 || 14–1 || –
|- align="center" bgcolor="#ccffcc"
| 16 || March 2 || Southwest Texas State || Olsen Field • College Station, Texas || 5–2 || 15–1 || –
|- align="center" bgcolor="#ffcccc"
| 17 || March 6 ||  || Olsen Field • College Station, Texas || 5–6 || 15–2 || –
|- align="center" bgcolor="#ccffcc"
| 18 || March 6 || Maine || Olsen Field • College Station, Texas || 11–2 || 16–2 || –
|- align="center" bgcolor="#ccffcc"
| 19 || March 7 || Maine || Olsen Field • College Station, Texas || 6–5 || 17–2 || –
|- align="center" bgcolor="#ccffcc"
| 20 || March 9 ||  || Olsen Field • College Station, Texas || 12–3 || 18–2 || –
|- align="center" bgcolor="#ccffcc"
| 21 || March 10 || Illinois State || Olsen Field • College Station, Texas || 9–4 || 19–2 || –
|- align="center" bgcolor="#ccffcc"
| 22 || March 10 || Illinois State || Olsen Field • College Station, Texas || 4–0 || 20–2 || –
|- align="center" bgcolor="#ccffcc"
| 23 || March 14 || at  || Maestri Field at Privateer Park • New Orleans, Louisiana || 9–4 || 21–2 || –
|- align="center" bgcolor="#ccffcc"
| 24 || March 14 || at New Orleans || Maestri Field at Privateer Park • New Orleans, Louisiana || 5–3 || 22–2 || –
|- align="center" bgcolor="#ccffcc"
| 25 || March 15 || at  || Alumini Field • Hammond, Louisiana || 5–1 || 23–2 || –
|- align="center" bgcolor="#ccffcc"
| 26 || March 20 || at  || TCU Diamond • Fort Worth, Texas || 8–2 || 24–2 || 1–0
|- align="center" bgcolor="#ccffcc"
| 27 || March 20 || at TCU || TCU Diamond • Fort Worth, Texas || 6–0 || 25–2 || 2–0
|- align="center" bgcolor="#ffcccc"
| 28 || March 21 || at TCU || TCU Diamond • Fort Worth, Texas || 2–3 || 25–3 || 2–1
|- align="center" bgcolor="#ccffcc"
| 29 || March 23 || Sam Houston State || Olsen Field • College Station, Texas || 11–7 || 26–3 || 2–1
|- align="center" bgcolor="#ccffcc"
| 30 || March 26 || at  || Cougar Field • Houston, Texas || 6–3 || 27–3 || 3–1
|- align="center" bgcolor="#ccffcc"
| 31 || March 27 || at Houston || Cougar Field • Houston, Texas || 20–10 || 28–3 || 4–1
|- align="center" bgcolor="#ccffcc"
| 32 || March 27 || at Houston || Cougar Field • Houston, Texas || 19–14 || 29–3 || 5–1
|- align="center" bgcolor="#ccffcc"
| 33 || March 30 ||  || Olsen Field • College Station, Texas || 8–7 || 30–3 || 5–1
|- align="center" bgcolor="#ccffcc"
| 34 || March 30 || Mary Hardin–Baylor || Olsen Field • College Station, Texas || 11–4 || 31–3 || 5–1
|-

|- align="center" bgcolor="#ccffcc"
| 35 || April 2 ||  || Olsen Field • College Station, Texas || 16–0 || 32–3 || 5–1
|- align="center" bgcolor="#ccffcc"
| 36 || April 2 || Lubbock Christian || Olsen Field • College Station, Texas || 18–3 || 33–3 || 5–1
|- align="center" bgcolor="#ffcccc"
| 37 || April 6 || at  || Clay Gould Ballpark • Arlington, Texas || 6–8 || 33–4 || 5–1
|- align="center" bgcolor="#ccffcc"
| 38 || April 9 ||  || Olsen Field • College Station, Texas || 6–1 || 34–4 || 6–1
|- align="center" bgcolor="#ccffcc"
| 39 || April 10 || Texas Tech || Olsen Field • College Station, Texas || 11–4 || 35–4 || 7–1
|- align="center" bgcolor="#ccffcc"
| 40 || April 10 || Texas Tech || Olsen Field • College Station, Texas || 4–3 || 36–4 || 8–1
|- align="center" bgcolor="#ffcccc"
| 41 || April 13 || Sam Houston State || Olsen Field • College Station, Texas || 6–7 || 36–5 || 8–1
|- align="center" bgcolor="#ccffcc"
| 42 || April 13 || Sam Houston State || Olsen Field • College Station, Texas || 5–4 || 37–5 || 8–1
|- align="center" bgcolor="#ccffcc"
| 43 || April 14 ||  || Olsen Field • College Station, Texas || 12–2 || 38–5 || 8–1
|- align="center" bgcolor="#ccffcc"
| 44 || April 16 || at  || Ferrell Field • Waco, Texas || 1–0 || 39–5 || 9–1
|- align="center" bgcolor="#ffcccc"
| 45 || April 17 || Baylor || Olsen Field • College Station, Texas || 1–2 || 39–6 || 9–2
|- align="center" bgcolor="#ccffcc"
| 46 || April 17 || Baylor || Olsen Field • College Station, Texas || 9–2 || 40–6 || 10–2
|- align="center" bgcolor="#ccffcc"
| 47 || April 20 || UT Arlington || Olsen Field • College Station, Texas || 4–2 || 41–6 || 10–2
|- align="center" bgcolor="#ccffcc"
| 48 || April 23 ||  || Olsen Field • College Station, Texas || 7–6 || 42–6 || 11–2
|- align="center" bgcolor="#ccffcc"
| 49 || April 24 || Rice || Olsen Field • College Station, Texas || 12–9 || 43–6 || 12–2
|- align="center" bgcolor="#ccffcc"
| 50 || April 24 || Rice || Olsen Field • College Station, Texas || 16–10 || 44–6 || 13–2
|- align="center" bgcolor="#ccffcc"
| 51 || April 27 ||  || Olsen Field • College Station, Texas || 2–0 || 45–6 || 13–2
|- align="center" bgcolor="#ccffcc"
| 52 || April 30 || Texas || Olsen Field • College Station, Texas || 6–2 || 46–6 || 14–2
|-

|- align="center" bgcolor="#ccffcc"
| 53 || May 1 || at Texas || Disch–Falk Field • Austin, Texas || 9–1 || 47–6 || 15–2
|- align="center" bgcolor="#ffcccc"
| 54 || May 2 || at Texas || Disch–Falk Field • Austin, Texas || 1–3 || 47–7 || 15–3
|-

|-
|-
! style="" | Postseason
|- valign="top"

|- align="center" bgcolor="#ffcccc"
| 55 || May 13 || at Texas || Disch–Falk Field • Austin, Texas || 7–21 || 47–8 || 15–3
|- align="center" bgcolor="#ccffcc"
| 56 || May 14 || vs Texas Tech || Disch–Falk Field • Austin, Texas || 10–8 || 48–8 || 15–3
|- align="center" bgcolor="#ffcccc"
| 57 || May 15 || at Texas || Disch–Falk Field • Austin, Texas || 10–11 || 48–9 || 15–3
|-

|- align="center" bgcolor="#ccffcc"
| 58 || May 27 ||  || Olsen Field • College Station, Texas || 13–1 || 49–9 || 15–3
|- align="center" bgcolor="#ccffcc"
| 59 || May 28 ||  || Olsen Field • College Station, Texas || 10–5 || 50–9 || 15–3
|- align="center" bgcolor="#ccffcc"
| 60 || May 29 ||  || Olsen Field • College Station, Texas || 11–4 || 51–9 || 15–3
|- align="center" bgcolor="#ccffcc"
| 61 || May 30 ||  || Olsen Field • College Station, Texas || 14–2 || 52–9 || 15–3
|-

|- align="center" bgcolor="#ccffcc"
| 62 || June 4 || vs  || Johnny Rosenblatt Stadium • Omaha, Nebraska || 5–1 || 53–9 || 15–3
|- align="center" bgcolor="#ffcccc"
| 63 || June 6 || vs LSU || Johnny Rosenblatt Stadium • Omaha, Nebraska || 8–13 || 53–10 || 15–3
|- align="center" bgcolor="#ffcccc"
| 64 || June 8 || vs  || Johnny Rosenblatt Stadium • Omaha, Nebraska || 2–6 || 53–11 || 15–3
|-

Awards and honors 
Chris Clemons
 All-Southwest Conference

Lee Fedora
 All-Southwest Conference Tournament Team

Eric Gonzalez
 All-Southwest Conference

Jeff Granger
 First Team All-American Baseball America
 First Team All-American American Baseball Coaches Association
 First Team All-American National Collegiate Baseball Writers Association
 Third Team All-American Mizuno Collegiate Baseball
 All-Southwest Conference

Billy Harlan
 All-Southwest Conference Tournament Team

Robert Harris
 All-Southwest Conference

Trey Moore
 First Team All-American National Collegiate Baseball Writers Association
 Second Team All-American Mizuno Collegiate Baseball
 Third Team All-American Baseball America
 Third Team All-American American Baseball Coaches Association
 All-Southwest Conference

Brian Parker
 All-Southwest Conference

Brian Thomas
 First Team All-American American Baseball Coaches Association
 First Team All-American National Collegiate Baseball Writers Association
 Third Team All-American Baseball America
 Third Team All-American Mizuno Collegiate Baseball
 All-Southwest Conference

References 

Texas A&M Aggies baseball seasons
Texas A&M Aggies baseball
College World Series seasons
Texas A&M
Southwest Conference baseball champion seasons